Ashinu Township (Mandarin: 阿什努乡) is a township in Hualong Hui Autonomous County, Haidong, Qinghai, China. In 2010, Ashinu Township had a total population of 3,881: 1,981 males and 1,900 females: 1,156 aged under 14, 2,508 aged between 15 and 65 and 217 aged over 65.

References 
 

Township-level divisions of Qinghai
Haidong